An election to Dún Laoghaire–Rathdown County Council took place on 5 June 2009 as part of that year's Irish local elections. 28 councillors were elected from six electoral divisions by PR-STV voting for a five-year term of office.

Results by party

Results by Electoral Area

Ballybrack

Blackrock

Dundrum

Dún Laoghaire

Glencullen-Sandyford

Stillorgan

External links
 Official website

2009
2009